The Liverpool, London and Globe Building is located in Dale Street, Liverpool, Merseyside, England.  It fills a block adjacent to the Town Hall, bounded to the northeast by Exchange Street East and to the southwest by High Street.

History

The building was constructed between 1856 and 1858 for the Liverpool and London Globe Insurance Company.  The architect was C. R. Cockerell, who was assisted by his son F. P. Cockerell, and by Christopher F. Heyward.  An attic storey was added to the building in the 1920s.

Architecture

It is constructed in ashlar, with rusticated quoins and a slate roof.  The building is in three storeys with a basement and attics.  The Dale Street front has seven bays, and there are 15 bays along the sides.  The entrance in Dale Street is flanked by red granite Doric columns.  The windows in the ground floor have segmental arches.  Those in the second floor are recessed behind a Corinthian colonnade with balconies.  The building has a Mansard roof with dormers.  It is recorded in the National Heritage List for England as a designated Grade II listed building.

See also
Architecture of Liverpool

References

Grade II listed buildings in Liverpool
Commercial buildings completed in 1858
Buildings with mansard roofs